Hazard symbols or warning symbols are recognisable symbols designed to warn about hazardous or dangerous materials, locations, or objects, including electromagnetic fields, electric currents; harsh, toxic or unstable chemicals (acids, poisons, explosives); and radioactivity. The use of hazard symbols is often regulated by law and directed by standards organizations. Hazard symbols may appear with different colors, backgrounds, borders, and supplemental information in order to specify the type of hazard and the level of threat (for example, toxicity classes).  Warning symbols are used in many places in lieu of or addition to written warnings as they are quickly recognized (faster than reading a written warning) and more commonly understood (the same symbol can be recognized as having the same meaning to speakers of different languages).

List of common symbols

Tape with yellow and black diagonal stripes is commonly used as a generic hazard warning.  This can be in the form of barricade tape, or as a self-adhesive tape for marking floor areas and the like.  In some regions (for instance the UK) yellow tape is buried a certain distance above buried electrical cables to warn future groundworkers of the hazard.

Generic warning symbol

On roadside warning signs, an exclamation mark is often used to draw attention to a generic warning of danger, hazards, and the unexpected. In Europe, this type of sign is used if there are no more-specific signs to denote a particular hazard. When used for traffic signs, it is accompanied by a supplementary sign describing the hazard, usually mounted under the exclamation mark.

This symbol has also been more widely adopted for generic use in many other contexts not associated with road traffic. It often appears on hazardous equipment or in instruction manuals to draw attention to a precaution, when a more-specific warning symbol is not available.

Poison symbol

The skull-and-crossbones symbol, consisting of a human skull and two bones crossed together behind the skull, is today generally used as a warning of danger of death, particularly in regard to poisonous substances.

The symbol, or some variation thereof, specifically with the bones (or swords) below the skull, was also featured on the Jolly Roger, the traditional flag of European and American seagoing pirates. It is also part of the Canadian WHMIS home symbols placed on containers to warn that the contents are poisonous.

In the United States, due to concerns that the skull-and-crossbones symbol's association with pirates might encourage children to play with toxic materials, the Mr. Yuk symbol is also used to denote poison.

Ionizing radiation symbol 	 

The international radiation symbol is a trefoil around a small central circle representing radiation from an atom.  It first appeared in 1946 at the University of California, Berkeley Radiation Laboratory. At the time, it was rendered as magenta, and was set on a blue background. The shade of magenta used (Martin Senour Roman Violet No. 2225) was chosen because it was expensive and less likely to be used on other signs.  However, a blue background for other signs started to be used extensively.  Blue was typically used on information signs and the color tended to fade with weathering.  This resulted in the background being changed on the radiation hazard sign.  The original version used in the United States is magenta against a yellow background, and it is drawn with a central circle of radius R, an internal radius of 1.5R and an external radius of 5R for the blades, which are separated from each other by 60°. The trefoil is black in the international version, which is also used in the United States.

The symbol was adopted as a standard in the US by ANSI in 1969.  It was first documented as an international symbol in 1963 in International Organization for Standardization (ISO) recommendation R.361.  In 1974, after approval by national standards bodies, the symbol became an international standard as ISO 361 Basic ionizing radiation symbol. The standard specifies the shape, proportions, application and restrictions on the use of the symbol.  It may be used to signify the actual or potential presence of ionizing radiation. It is not used for non-ionizing electromagnetic waves or sound waves. The standard does not specify the radiation levels at which it is to be used.

The sign is commonly referred to as a radioactivity warning sign, but it is actually a warning sign of ionizing radiation. Ionizing radiation is a much broader category than radioactivity alone, as many non-radioactive sources also emit potentially dangerous levels of ionizing radiation. This includes x-ray apparatus, radiotherapy linear accelerators, and particle accelerators. Non-ionizing radiation can also reach potentially dangerous levels, but this warning sign is different from the trefoil ionizing radiation warning symbol.  The sign is not to be confused with the fallout shelter identification sign introduced by the Office of Civil Defense in 1961.  This was originally intended to be the same of the radiation hazard symbol but was changed to a slightly different symbol because shelters are a place of safety, not of hazard.

On February 15, 2007, two groups—the International Atomic Energy Agency (IAEA) and the International Organization for Standardization (ISO)—jointly announced the adoption of a new ionizing radiation warning symbol to supplement the traditional trefoil symbol. The new symbol, to be used on sealed radiation sources, is aimed at alerting anyone, anywhere to the danger of being close to a strong source of ionizing radiation. It depicts, on a red background, a black trefoil with waves of radiation streaming from it, along with a black skull and crossbones, and a running figure with an arrow pointing away from the scene. The radiating trefoil suggests the presence of radiation, while the red background and the skull and crossbones warn of danger. The figure running away from the scene is meant to suggest taking action to avoid the labeled material. The new symbol is not intended to be generally visible, but rather to appear on internal components of devices that house radiation sources so that if anybody attempts to disassemble such devices they will see an explicit warning not to proceed any further.

Biohazard symbol

 	 

The biohazard symbol is used in the labeling of biological materials that carry a significant health risk, including viral and bacteriological samples, including infected dressings and used hypodermic needles (see sharps waste).

History
The biohazard symbol was developed by the Dow Chemical Company in 1966 for their containment products.

According to Charles Baldwin, an environmental-health engineer who contributed to its development: "We wanted something that was memorable but meaningless, so we could educate people as to what it means." In an article in Science in 1967, the symbol was presented as the new standard for all biological hazards ("biohazards"). The article explained that over 40 symbols were drawn up by Dow artists, and all of the symbols investigated had to meet a number of criteria: "(i) striking in form in order to draw immediate attention; (ii) unique and unambiguous, in order not to be confused with symbols used for other purposes; (iii) quickly recognizable and easily recalled; (iv) easily stenciled; (v) symmetrical, in order to appear identical from all angles of approach; and (vi) acceptable to groups of varying ethnic backgrounds." The chosen scored the best on nationwide testing for memorability.

Geometry

All parts of the biohazard sign can be drawn with a compass and straightedge. The basic outline of the symbol is a plain trefoil, which is three circles overlapping each other equally like in a triple Venn diagram with the overlapping parts erased. The diameter of the overlapping part is equal to half the radius of the three circles. Then three inner circles are drawn in with  radius of the original circles so that it is tangent to the outside three overlapping circles. A tiny circle in center has a diameter  of the radius of the three inner circles, and arcs are erased at 90°, 210°, and 330°. The arcs of the inner circles and the tiny circle are connected by a line. Finally, the ring under is drawn from the distance to the perimeter of the equilateral triangle that forms between the centers of the three intersecting circles. An outer circle of the ring under is drawn and finally enclosed with the arcs from the center of the inner circles with a shorter radius from the inner circles.

Chemical symbols
A chemical hazard symbol is a pictogram applied to containers of dangerous chemical compounds to indicate the specific hazard, and thus the required precautions. There are several systems of labels, depending on the purpose, such as on the container for end-use, or on a vehicle during transportation.

GHS symbols and statements

The United Nations has designed GHS hazard pictograms and GHS hazard statements to internationally harmonize chemical hazard warnings. Several European countries have started to implement these new global standards, but older warning symbols are still used in many parts of the world.

Europe

European standards are set by:
 CLP regulation (2008) for chemical containers, following international GHS recommendations; see European CLP/GHS hazard symbols
 European Agreement concerning the International Carriage of Dangerous Goods by Road (ADR) for additional packaging for transportation. Vehicles carrying dangerous goods must be equipped with orange signs, where the upper code number identifies the type of hazard, and the lower code number identifies the specific substance. These symbols cannot be readily interpreted without the aid of a table to translate the numerical codes.

Canada

The Workplace Hazardous Materials Information System, or WHMIS, is Canada's national workplace hazard communication standard.

United States

The US-based National Fire Protection Association (NFPA) has a standard NFPA 704 using a diamond with four colored sections each with a number indicating severity 0–4 (0 for no hazard, 4 indicates a severe hazard). The red section denotes flammability. The blue section denotes health risks. Yellow represents reactivity (tendency to explode). The white section denotes special hazard information. One example of a special hazard would be the capital letter W crossed out (pictured left), indicating it is water reactant.

Non-standard symbols

A large number of warning symbols with non-standard designs are in use around the world.

Some warning symbols have been redesigned to be more comprehensible to children, such as the Mr. Ouch (depicting an electricity danger as a snarling, spiky creature) and Mr. Yuk (a green frowny face sticking its tongue out, to represent poison) designs in the United States.

See also
 
 Pictogram
 ISO 7010 – ISO standard for safety symbols
 ISO 7001 – ISO standard for public information symbols.
 GHS hazard pictograms – Symbols used by the Globally Harmonized System of Classification and Labelling of Chemicals
 Safety sign

References

External links

 Hazchem Guide from The National Chemical Emergency Centre
 European Chemicals Bureau
 Directive 2001/59/EC
 Hazchem panel information

Pictograms
Infographics
Occupational safety and health
Symbols